This List of synagogues in Ukraine contains active, otherwise used and destroyed synagogues in Ukraine. In all cases the year of the completion of the building is given. Italics indicate an approximate date.

External links 
  Old postcards and photos of synagogues in Ukraine
  Old pictures of synagogues (many in Ukraine) - alamy.de

Literature 
 Maria and Kazimierz Piechotka: Landscape With Menorah: Jews in the towns and cities of the former Rzeczpospolita of Poland and Lithuania. Salix alba Press, Warsaw 2015, .
 Maria und Kazimierz Piechotka: Heaven’s Gates. Wooden synagogues  in the territories of the former Polish-Lithuanian Commenwealth. Polish Institute of World Art Studies & POLIN Museum of the History of Polish Jews, Warschau 2015, .
 Maria und Kazimierz Piechotka: Heaven’s Gates. Masonry synagogues  in the territories of the former Polish–Lithuanian Commonwealth. Polish Institute of World Art Studies & POLIN Museum of the History of Polish Jews, Warschau 2017, .
 Sergey R. Kravtsov, Vladimir Levin. Synagogues in Ukraine VOLHYNIA  Volume 1 and 2. The Center Of Jewish Art. .

 
Ukraine
Synagogues